Mingazzini is an Italian surname. Notable people with the surname include:

Giovanni Mingazzini (1859–1929), Italian neurologist
Nicola Mingazzini (born 1980), Italian footballer

Italian-language surnames